Lapikov is a Russian masculine surname, its feminine counterpart is Lapikova. Notable people with the surname include:

Dmitry Lapikov (born 1982), Russian weightlifter 
Ivan Lapikov (1922–1993), Soviet and Russian actor

Russian-language surnames